Port Kent station is an Amtrak intercity train station in Port Kent, Essex County, New York. The station is an open platformed shelter.  The train only stops at this station when the Lake Champlain Transportation Company Port Kent–Burlington Ferry is in operation from May to October (typically Columbus Day).

The Delaware and Hudson Railroad built a freight station on the shores of Port Kent sometime between 1875 and 1876, and an open shelter in 1911, similar to the existing one. Amtrak has stopped at the site since April 24, 1977, but the existing shelter was only established in 1989. The station has one low-level side platform on the west side of the single track.

References

External links

Port Kent Amtrak Station (USA Rail Guide -- Train Web)
Burlington, VT - Port Kent, NY (Lake Champlain Ferries)

Amtrak stations in New York (state)
Transportation buildings and structures in Essex County, New York
Former Delaware and Hudson Railway stations